Pretoria Heat is a basketball team in from Pretoria, Gauteng Province, South Africa. Traditionally, the team has provided the South Africa national basketball team with several key players, including Shane Marhanele and Neo Mothiba who both played in the starting lineup at the 2011 FIBA Africa Championship in Madagascar.

Notable players

 Shane Marhanele
 Neo Mothiba 
 Raoul Mballa

References

External links 
 Summary of Ashraf Lodewyk Memorial Tournament on basketballsouthafrica.co.za
 Presentation on Africabasket.com
  Presentation on Facebook

Basketball teams in South Africa
Basketball teams established in 2003
Sport in Pretoria